The 2017 Rally Italia Sardegna was the seventh round of the 2017 World Rally Championship and was the 14th running of the Rally d'Italia Sardegna. It was won by Ott Tänak and co-driver Martin Järveoja which was their first win in the WRC. Jari-Matti Latvala and Miikka Anttila finished second, with Thierry Neuville and Nicolas Gilsoul finished in third position.

Championship leaders Sébastien Ogier and Julien Ingrassia, Tänak and Järveoja's teammates at  M-Sport, finished fifth, helping the team extend their lead in the championship for manufacturers.

Jan Kopecký and his co-driver Pavel Dresler won the WRC-2 category.

Entry list

Classification

Event standings

Special stages

Power Stage
The Power Stage was a  stage at the end of the rally.

Championship standings after the rally

Drivers' Championship standings

Manufacturers' Championship standings

References

External links
 The official website of the World Rally Championship

2017 World Rally Championship season
2017
2017 in Italian motorsport
June 2017 sports events in Europe